Kultuk is an urban locality (a work settlement) in Slyudyansky District of Irkutsk Oblast, Russia, located on the southwestern tip of Lake Baikal. Population: 

The community is the site of a Chinese-owned water bottling factory under construction as of 2019.

History
It was established in 1647.

References

Urban-type settlements in Irkutsk Oblast
1647 establishments in Russia
Populated places on Lake Baikal